Senator Abdullahi Abubakar Gumel (born 20 April 1979) is a Nigerian politician and member of the 8th National Assembly from Jigawa State. He represented Jigawa North West Senatorial District.

In the Senate, he is the Chairman Senate Committee on States and Local Government.

Early life and education 
Abdullahi Abubakar Gumel was born on April 20, 1949 and he is native of Maigatari LGA of Jigawa State.

He holds a master's degree in Public Policy and Administration from the Bayero University Kano, Kano State. But before that, he attended Kaduna Polytechnics Kaduna, Kaduna State where he obtained his National Diploma in Accountancy before proceeding to Bayero University Kano, where he obtained Advance Diploma in Public Administration and Post Graduate Diploma in Public Policy and Administration.

Abdullahi Gumel has served in various capacities. He was the Deputy Headmaster of Gumel Gabas Primary School Gumel, Jigawa State (1969-1971), Stenographer at Kano State Home Affairs, Kano State (1972), Senior Accountant at Nigerian Television Authority NTA Kano, State (1976-1979), Chief Accountant at National Party of Nigeria (NPN) National Headquarter, Lagos (1979-1983) and Board Member at Nigeria Enterprises Promotion Council (1980-1983), Nigeria Securities and Exchange Commission (1983) and Kano State Sports Councils (1980-1983).

Political career 
Gumel's passion to serve his people motivated him into politics. In 1999, he was elected  a member of House of Representatives (Nigeria) representing Gumel Federal Constituency (Gumel/Maitagri/SuleTanrarkar/Gagarawa LGAs). While in House, he served as the Chairman House Committee on Special Duties 1999-2000 and Chairman House Committee on Police Affairs 2001- 2003.

In 2003, he was appointment the  Special Adviser to the then Honourable Speaker (Aminu Bello Masari) on Special Assignments 2003–2007.

He was elected Senator for Jigawa State North West Senatorial District in 2015 under the platform of All Progressives Congress.

Personal life 
He is married and has children.

References

External links 
 www.nass.gov.ng

Nigerian politicians
Living people
1940s births
Year of birth missing (living people)